Ernest Jack Petoskey (October 15, 1921 – March 3, 2017) was an American football player and coach.  He served as the head football coach at Hillsdale College from 1949 to 1950 and Western Michigan University from 1953 to 1956, compiling a career college football record of 19–32–3. A native of Dearborn, Michigan, Petoskey played college football at an end at the University of Michigan from 1940 to 1943. He then served in the United States Navy during World War II.

Coaching career
Petoskey  was the head football coach for the Hillsdale College in Hillsdale, Michigan.  He held that position for the 1949 and 1950 seasons.  His coaching record at Hillsdale was 11–7–1. Before going to Hillsdale he was head football coach at St. Joseph High School in St. Joseph, Michigan from 1947 to 1948, where his record was 7–5–3. He was an assistant at Western Michigan before being named head coach.

Head coaching record

College

References

1921 births
2017 deaths
Hillsdale Chargers football coaches
Michigan Wolverines football players
Western Michigan Broncos football coaches
High school football coaches in Michigan
United States Navy personnel of World War II
Sportspeople from Dearborn, Michigan
Sportspeople from Saginaw, Michigan
Coaches of American football from Michigan
Players of American football from Michigan